Callitriche verna is a submerged/floating-leaved aquatic plant in the family Plantaginaceae (though sometimes placed in its own family – Callitrichaceae).  It is found in aquatic environments in North America.

Description
Lower, submerged leaves linear, 0.3–1 mm wide; 1-nerved; shallowly bidentate at apex; terminal leaves petiolate; narrowly oblate to spatulate.

Distribution and habitat
In quiet shallow water; distributed in North America, including Mexico.

References

verna
Freshwater plants
Plants described in 1755
Taxa named by Carl Linnaeus